Milisav Sećković (born 22 May 1973) is a Montenegrin retired footballer who played as a midfielder.

References

1973 births
Living people
Footballers from Nikšić
Association football midfielders
Serbia and Montenegro footballers
Montenegrin footballers
FK Sutjeska Nikšić players
FK Vojvodina players
OFK Beograd players
FK Inter Bratislava players
FK Smederevo players
FC UTA Arad players
FK Modriča players
FK Čelik Nikšić players
Second League of Serbia and Montenegro players
First League of Serbia and Montenegro players
Slovak Super Liga players
Liga I players
Premier League of Bosnia and Herzegovina players
Montenegrin Second League players
Serbia and Montenegro expatriate footballers
Expatriate footballers in Slovakia 
Serbia and Montenegro expatriate sportspeople in Slovakia
Expatriate footballers in Romania 
Serbia and Montenegro expatriate sportspeople in Romania
Expatriate footballers in Bosnia and Herzegovina 
Serbia and Montenegro expatriate sportspeople in Bosnia and Herzegovina